The Permanent Representative of Turkey to the United Nations  is Turkey's foremost diplomatic representative to the United Nations (UN). The permanent representative (UN ambassador) is the head of the Permanent Mission of Turkey to the United Nations in New York City. The Permanent Representative is charged with representing Turkey, both through its non-permanent seat on the United Nations Security Council as well as during plenary meetings of the General Assembly.

The current Permanent Representative of Turkey to UN is Feridun Sinirlioğlu, who was appointed in October 2016.

History 
On 26 June 1945, the Charter of the United Nations was signed and came into force on 28 September 1945. Turkey was among the first countries that signed the United Nations Charter, becoming a founding member of the United Nations among 51 countries.

Permanent Mission of Turkey to the United Nations started its activities after the Permanent Representative Ambassador Selim Sarper presented his letter of credence to the Secretary-General of the United Nations on 15 August 1947.

List of Permanent Representatives 
The following diplomats served as the Permanent Representative of Turkey to the United Nations:

See also
 Permanent Mission of Turkey to the United Nations
 Turkey and the United Nations
 Foreign relations of Turkey
 List of diplomatic missions of Turkey
 List of current Permanent Representatives to the United Nations

References

External links 
 Permanent Mission of Turkey to the United Nations
 Ministry of Foreign Affairs of Turkey

United Nations
 
Turkey